Cecilia Akagu is a Brigadier General in Nigerian Army. She is an accountant and serves in the Accounts Directorate of the Army. She is married to Clifford Wande who is also a Brigadier General in Nigerian Army. They are the first couple to both attain the rank of Brigadier General in Nigerian Army.

Career and family life
Cecilia Akagu is a native of Ankpa in Ankpa Local Government Area of Kogi State, Nigeria. She is an accountant of the Finance Corp in Nigerian Army. She is the Director of Army Accounts Inspectorate. She is married to Mr. Clifford Wanda who is also a Brigadier General in Nigerian Army. Mr. Clifford Wanda is from Enugu Ngwo village in Enugu North Local Government Area of Enugu State, Nigeria. Brigadier General Cecelia Akagu and Brigadier General Clifford Wanda are not the first commissioned officers to be married in the Nigerian Army. However, they are the first couple to both attain the rank of Brigadier General as a married couple. Cecilia Akagu and Clifford Wanda met in 1990 during their orientation course in Nigerian Army. Having been both commissioned, they started their orientation course in Jaji. They were course mates during the orientation even though Cecilia Akagu was a Second Lieutenant and Clifford Wanda was a Lieutenant during the course. They have two children, a son and a daughter.

See also
Nigerian Army
Tukur Yusuf Buratai

References 

Living people
Nigerian security personnel
Women in law enforcement
20th-century Nigerian women
21st-century Nigerian women
Nigerian Army personnel
Nigerian female military personnel
Year of birth missing (living people)